The President's Daughter may refer to;

The President's Daughter, a 2021 novel by Bill Clinton and James Patterson
The President's Daughter (Britton book), a 1928 book by Nan Britton
The President's Daughter (White novel), a 1984 novel by Ellen Emerson White
The President's Daughter series, a series of books by White
Clotel; or, The President's Daughter, an 1853 novel by William Wells Brown
The President's Daughter (film), a South Korean film with Namkoong Won
The President's Daughter (Higgins book), a 1997 book by Jack Higgins